Joanna Pawlak (born 31 March 1991) is a Polish equestrian. She represented Poland at the 2020 Summer Olympics and competed in Individual and Team Eventing on her horse Fantastic Freida. She was eliminated from the competition when her horse failed the final trot-up.

References 

1991 births
Living people
Polish female equestrians
Olympic equestrians of Poland
Equestrians at the 2020 Summer Olympics
Event riders